Berdyash (Birźäş) is a rural locality (a selo) in Berdyashsky Selsoviet of Zilairsky District of the Republic of Bashkortostan, Russia. Population: 466 (2009 est.); 465 (2002 Census). OKATO code: 80227804001.

The district's population is composed predominantly of Chuvash people at 65%; the Russian population is also significant at 30%. Bashkirs account for 2% of the population.

References

Rural localities in Zilairsky District